British Rail Class D3/10 was a single experimental diesel-electric shunter locomotive commissioned by the Great Western Railway (GWR) in England, and later taken over by British Railways.

Building
The  locomotive was built for the GWR by Hawthorn Leslie of Newcastle upon Tyne, during 1935/6. It was equipped with an English Electric 6K diesel engine and two English Electric traction motors. It was delivered to Swindon Works in April 1936 as GWR No. 2. Under British Railways ownership, it was remumbered 15100 in March 1948, and classified D3/10 (later 3/11A).

Allocations 
After testing, the locomotive was allocated to Old Oak Common in October 1936 and used for shunting at Acton Yard. At the outbreak of the Second World War in September 1939, it was moved to Swansea East Dock and for a few years was loaned to the War Department at Swansea. From December 1944, it worked from Danygraig Shed in Swansea, returning to Old Oak Common in November 1947. 

Under British Railways, it was moved to Bristol's St. Philips Marsh in November 1948. In early 1950, it was sent to Derby Works for repair and returned to Old Oak Common in May 1950, and  Danygraig in December. In April 1951, it returned to St. Philips Marsh and returned to Swindon in January 1960, where it remained until its withdrawal in April 1965. It was sold for scrap to Cohen Brothers of Kettering in November 1965.

See also
 GWR diesel shunters
 List of British Rail classes

References

Sources

 Ian Allan ABC of British Railways Locomotives, Winter 1962–3
The Allocation History of BR Diesel Shunters, 2018.

0002
D003.10
C locomotives
Hawthorn Leslie and Company locomotives
Individual locomotives of Great Britain
Railway locomotives introduced in 1935
Standard gauge locomotives of Great Britain
Scrapped locomotives
Unique locomotives
Diesel-electric locomotives of Great Britain